Anthony Conrad Nesty (born November 25, 1967) is a former competition swimmer from Suriname who was an Olympic gold medallist in the 100-metre butterfly event in 1988. He is currently the head coach of the Florida Gators men's and women's swim team at the University of Florida, where he attended school.

Early years 

Anthony Nesty was born in Port of Spain in 1967, the youngest of five children in his family.  Nesty's family migrated to Suriname when he was seven months old, and he started swimming at the age of 5.  Nesty trained and competed in Suriname and the Caribbean through the beginning of his teenage years. He represented Suriname along with his sister, Pauline, at the 1983 Pan American Games.  After placing twenty-first in the 100-metre butterfly at the 1984 Summer Olympics in Los Angeles at just 16 years old, Nesty enrolled in The Bolles School in Jacksonville, Florida, a prep school with an athletic program known for training elite, world-class swimmers.  While training under Bolles coach Gregg Troy, Nesty broke the prep school 100-yard butterfly record held by Pablo Morales.  Breaking Morales's record was the beginning of prominent successes for Nesty.  He graduated from the Bolles School in 1987.

International swimming career 

Nesty returned to international competition at the 1987 Pan American Games in Indianapolis, Indiana, winning a gold medal in the 100-metre butterfly and a bronze medal in the 200-metre butterfly.

At the 1988 Summer Olympics in Seoul, Korea, Nesty edged American favorite Matt Biondi by one one-hundredth of a second to win the 100-metre butterfly; he finished the event in 53.00 seconds and Biondi in 53.01.  Nesty is the only Olympic medal winner from Suriname and after winning his Olympic gold medal, he was unbeaten in the 100-metre butterfly event for three years. Nesty was the first black male athlete and only the second black athlete to win an individual Olympic medal in swimming following Enith Brigitha at the 1976 Summer Olympics, and only the second South American swimmer to win an Olympic gold medal after Alberto Zorrilla in the 1928 Summer Olympics.

Nesty's victory in Seoul was a momentous social and political event for Afro-Caribbeans.  The Suriname government commemorated his gold-medal performance on a stamp and on gold and silver coins.  A 25-guilders bank note portraying an illustration of a butterfly swimmer was printed in his honor.  Surinam Airways named one of its planes after Nesty (this plane was destroyed in an accident while operating as Surinam Airways Flight 764), and the indoor stadium in Paramaribo was renamed for him.

Nesty won gold medals in the 100-metre butterfly at the Goodwill Games in 1990 and the FINA World Aquatics Championships in 1991.  At the 1991 Pan American Games in Havana, Cuba, he again won a gold medal in 100-metre butterfly and a silver in the 200-metre butterfly.  He attempted to defend his 1988 Olympic gold medal in the 100-metre butterfly at the 1992 Summer Olympics in Barcelona, Spain, but finished with a third-place bronze. At the 2008 Summer Olympics Parade of Nations of the 2008 Summer Olympics in Beijing, while long retired from competition as an athlete himself, Nesty was invited to be Suriname's flag bearer at the opening ceremony.

Nesty was inducted into the International Swimming Hall of Fame (ISHOF) as an "Honor Swimmer" in 1998, and the University of Florida Athletic Hall of Fame as a "Gator Great" in 2002.

College swimming career 

After winning his gold medal in Seoul, Nesty accepted an athletic scholarship to attend the University of Florida in Gainesville, Florida, where he enjoyed a successful swimming career with the Florida Gators swimming and diving team under coach Randy Reese and coach Skip Foster from 1989 to 1992.  During his four years of National Collegiate Athletic Association (NCAA) competition, he won three consecutive NCAA individual championships in the 100-yard butterfly (1990, 1991, 1992), one in the 200-yard butterfly (1990), and one as a member of the team's 400-yard medley relay team (1991), and received sixteen All-American honors. Nesty also won eleven Southeastern Conference (SEC) titles—five in individual races and six as a member of Gators relay teams.

Nesty graduated from the University of Florida with his bachelor's degree in 1994.

Coaching career 

In the mid 1990s, Nesty returned to the Bolles School as a member of the swim coaching staff.

Nesty was the associate head coach for the Florida Gators men's swimming team. As of June 4, 2018, he is the head coach for the Florida Gators men's swimming teams. On April 13, 2021, the university announced that Nesty would henceforth also be head coach of the Florida Gators women's swimming team. In November 2021, Caeleb Dressel would move under Nesty's college group at the University of Florida from his former long-time coach Gregg Troy. Notable swimmers currently under Nesty's direction include Katie Ledecky, Bobby Finke, and Kieran Smith.

In June 2021, Nesty was named Assistant Coach to the U.S. Men's Olympic Swim Team.   In February 2022, he was named Head Coach of the U.S. Men's Swim Team for the 2022 FINA World Championships in Budapest.

See also 

 Florida Gators
 List of Olympic medalists in swimming (men)
 List of University of Florida alumni
 List of University of Florida Olympians
 List of University of Florida Athletic Hall of Fame members
 List of World Aquatics Championships medalists in swimming (men)

References

External links 

 
 
 

1967 births
Living people
Florida Gators men's swimmers
Male butterfly swimmers
Medalists at the 1988 Summer Olympics
Medalists at the 1992 Summer Olympics
Olympic bronze medalists for Suriname
Olympic gold medalists for Suriname
Olympic bronze medalists in swimming
Olympic swimmers of Suriname
Pan American Games bronze medalists for Suriname
Pan American Games gold medalists for Suriname
Pan American Games silver medalists for Suriname
Pan American Games medalists in swimming
Surinamese male swimmers
Swimmers at the 1983 Pan American Games
Swimmers at the 1984 Summer Olympics
Swimmers at the 1987 Pan American Games
Swimmers at the 1988 Summer Olympics
Swimmers at the 1991 Pan American Games
Swimmers at the 1992 Summer Olympics
World Aquatics Championships medalists in swimming
Olympic gold medalists in swimming
Bolles School alumni
Competitors at the 1986 Central American and Caribbean Games
Central American and Caribbean Games gold medalists for Suriname
Central American and Caribbean Games medalists in swimming
Goodwill Games medalists in swimming
Competitors at the 1990 Goodwill Games
Medalists at the 1987 Pan American Games
Medalists at the 1991 Pan American Games